The 1997–98 Miami Hurricanes men's basketball team represented the University of Miami during the 1997–98 NCAA Division I men's basketball season. The Hurricanes, led by eighth-year head coach Leonard Hamilton, played their home games at the Miami Arena and were members of the Big East Conference. They finished the season 18–10, 11–7 in Big East play to finish in second place in the Big East 7 division. They lost in the second round of the 1998 Big East men's basketball tournament to St. John's. They were invited to the 1998 NCAA Division I men's basketball tournament where they fell in the opening round to UCLA. This just the program's second overall appearance in the NCAA Tournament and first since 1960.

Roster

Schedule and results

|-
!colspan=12 style=| Regular season

|-
!colspan=12 style=| Big East tournament

|-
!colspan=12 style=| NCAA tournament

References

Miami Hurricanes men's basketball seasons
Miami
Miami
1997 in sports in Florida
1998 in sports in Florida